Handeck is a village in the municipality of Guttannen, Switzerland. The village is located near the lake Gelmersee, which may be reached by Gelmerbahn from Handeck. There is a hotel and bridge at the village.

Geography
The trail is primarily used for hiking and walking. It has an elevation of 1,423 meters. The road to Grimsel Pass summit goes right by a pair of short tunnels to Handeck.

Places 
Handeck has a hotel and a bridge named "Suspension Bridge". It also has a waterfall. There is also a chalet, the first-halting place, which is beautiful. The village's cascade surpasses all others in Switzerland.

Culture
Part of the permanent collection at the Cleveland Museum of Art is an oil painting by French painter Jean-Léon Gérôme which depicts the beauty of this locale still today, as it was during his world travels in the 1850s.

References

Villages in the canton of Bern